State Route 330 (SR 330) is a state highway in East Tennessee, most of which is also known as Frost Bottom Road, runs southwest to northeast from Oliver Springs to the junction with SR 116 at Laurel Grove. SR 330 was designated a state highway about 1982.

Route description

SR 330 begins in Roane County in Oliver Springs at an intersection with SR 61 and SR 62. It goes south as Winter Gap Road before turning east (left) on Main Street. It then enters downtown curves to the south to cross over a railroad track to enter Anderson County. It then comes to a 4-way stop, where SR 330 turns east (left) onto E Spring Street, where it leaves downtown and begins passing through neighborhoods. It then has another railroad crossing before leaving Oliver Springs and becoming slightly curvy for a short distance before crossing a bridge and coming to an intersection with Dutch Valley Road, where SR 330 turns northeast (left) onto Frost Bottom Road. It continues northeast through a narrow valley through rural areas as an improved 2-lane highway before entering Laurel Grove and coming to an end at an intersection with SR 116.

The entire route of SR 330 is a 2-lane roadway.

Junction list

References

330